Sense of community (or psychological sense of community) is a concept in community psychology, social psychology, and community social work, as well as in several other research disciplines, such as urban sociology, which focuses on the experience of community rather than its structure, formation, setting, or other features. The latter is the province of public administration or community services administration which needs to understand how structures influence this feeling and psychological sense of community. Sociologists, social psychologists, anthropologists, and others have theorized about and carried out empirical research on community, but the psychological approach asks questions about the individual's perception, understanding, attitudes, feelings, etc. about community and his or her relationship to it and to others' participation—indeed to the complete, multifaceted community experience.

In his seminal 1974 book, psychologist Seymour B. Sarason proposed that psychological sense of community become the conceptual center for the psychology of community, asserting that it "is one of the major bases for self-definition." By 1986 it was regarded as a central overarching concept for community psychology (Sarason, 1986; Chavis & Pretty, 1999).In addition, the theoretical concept entered the other applied academic disciplines as part of "communities for all" initiatives in the US.

Among theories of sense of community proposed by psychologists, McMillan & Chavis's (1986) is by far the most influential, and is the starting point for most of the recent research in the field. It is discussed in detail below.

Definitions 

For Sarason, psychological sense of community is "the perception of similarity to others, an acknowledged interdependence with others, a willingness to maintain this interdependence by giving to or doing for others what one expects from them, and the feeling that one is part of a larger dependable and stable structure" (1974, p. 157).

McMillan & Chavis (1986) define a sense of community as "a feeling that members have of belonging, a feeling that members matter to one another and to the group, and a shared faith that members' needs will be met through their commitment to be together."

Gusfield (1975) identified two dimensions of community: territorial and relational. The relational dimension of community has to do with the nature and quality of relationships in that community, and some communities may even have no discernible territorial demarcation, as in the case of a community of scholars working in a particular specialty, who have some kind of contact and quality of relationship, but may live and work in disparate locations, perhaps even throughout the world. Other communities may seem to be defined primarily according to territory, as in the case of neighbourhoods, but even in such cases, proximity or shared territory cannot by itself constitute a community; the relational dimension is also essential.

Factor analysis of their urban neighbourhoods questionnaire yielded two distinct factors that Riger and Lavrakas (1981) characterized as "social bonding" and "physical rootedness", very similar to the two dimensions proposed by Gusfield.
Early work on psychological sense of community was based on neighborhoods as the referent, and found a relationship between psychological sense of community and greater participation (Hunter, 1975; Wandersman & Giamartino, 1980), perceived safety (Doolittle & McDonald, 1978), ability to function competently in the community (Glynn, 1981), social bonding (Riger & Lavrakas, 1981), social fabric (strengths of interpersonal relationship) (Ahlbrandt & Cunningham, 1979), greater sense of purpose and perceived control (Bachrach & Zautra, 1985), and greater civic contributions (charitable contributions and civic involvement) (Davidson & Cotter, 1986). These initial studies lacked a clearly articulated conceptual framework, however, and none of the measures developed were based on a theoretical definition of psychological sense of community.

Primary theoretical foundation: McMillan and Chavis 

McMillan & Chavis's (1986) theory (and instrument) are the most broadly validated and widely utilized in this area in the psychological literature. They prefer the abbreviated label "sense of community", and propose that sense of community is composed of four elements.

Four elements of sense of community
There are four elements of "sense of community" according to the McMillan & Chavis theory:

Membership
Membership includes five attributes:
 boundaries
 emotional safety
 a sense of belonging and identification
 personal investment
 a common symbol system

Influence
Influence works both ways: members need to feel that they have some influence in the group, and some influence by the group on its members is needed for group cohesion. Recent research (e.g. Chigbu, 2013) on rural and urban communities have found that sense of community is a major factor.

Integration and fulfillment of needs
Members feel rewarded in some way for their participation in the community.

Shared emotional connection
The "definitive element for true community" (1986, p. 14), it includes shared history and shared participation (or at least identification with the history).

Dynamics within and between the elements
McMillan & Chavis (1986) give the following example to illustrate the dynamics within and between these four elements (p. 16):
Someone puts an announcement on the dormitory bulletin board about the formation of an intramural dormitory basketball team. People attend the organizational meeting as strangers out of their individual needs (integration and fulfillment of needs). The team is bound by place of residence (membership boundaries are set) and spends time together in practice (the contact hypothesis). They play a game and win (successful shared valent event). While playing, members exert energy on behalf of the team (personal investment in the group). As the team continues to win, team members become recognized and congratulated (gaining honor and status for being members). Someone suggests that they all buy matching shirts and shoes (common symbols) and they do so (influence).

Current research
In their 2002 study of a community of interest, specifically the science fiction fandom community, Obst, Zinkiewicz, and Smith suggest Conscious Identification as the fifth dimension (Obst, 2002).

Empirical assessment 

Chavis et al.'s Sense of Community Index (SCI) (see Chipuer & Pretty, 1999; Long & Perkins, 2003), originally designed primarily in reference to neighborhoods, can be adapted to study other communities as well, including the workplace, schools, religious communities, communities of interest, etc.

See also 
 Anomie, (The Division of Labor in Society, Émile Durkheim)
 Communitarianism, (The Spirit of Community, Amitai Etzioni)
 Gemeinschaft and Gesellschaft (Community and Society, Ferdinand Tönnies)
 Imagined communities
 Interest network
 Online participation
 Social solidarity
 Community practice (Social Work)

Notes

References 
 Chigbu, U.E. (2013). Fostering rural sense of place: the missing piece in Uturu, Nigeria. Development In Practice, 23 (2): pp. 264–277. View and download article: http://www.tandfonline.com/doi/abs/10.1080/09614524.2013.772120
 Chavis, D.M., Hogge, J.H., McMillan, D.W., & Wandersman, A. (1986). Sense of community through Brunswick's lens: A first look. Journal of Community Psychology, 14(1), 24-40.
 Chavis, D.M., & Pretty, G. (1999). Sense of community: Advances in measurement and application. Journal of Community Psychology, 27(6), 635-642.
 Chipuer, H. M., & Pretty, G. M. H. (1999). A review of the Sense of Community Index: Current uses, factor structure, reliability, and further development. Journal of Community Psychology, 27(6), 643-658. 
 Glynn, T. J. (1981). Psychological sense of community: Measurement and application. Human Relations, 34(9), 789-818. doi:10.1177/001872678103400904
 Gusfield, J. R. (1975). The community: A critical response. New York: Harper Colophon.
 Long, D.A., & Perkins, D.D. (2003). Confirmatory Factor Analysis of the Sense of Community Index and Development of a Brief SCI. Journal of Community Psychology, 31, 279-296.
 McMillan, D.W., & Chavis, D.M. (1986). Sense of community: A definition and theory. Journal of Community Psychology, 14(1), 6-23.
 Obst, P., Zinkiewicz, L., & Smith, S. G. (2002). Sense of community in science fiction fandom, Part 1: Understanding sense of community in an international community of interest. Journal of Community Psychology, 30(1), 87-103.
 Riger, S. & Lavrakas, P. (1981). Community ties patterns of attachment and social interaction in urban neighborhoods. American Journal of Community Psychology, 9, 55-66. 
 Sarason, S.B. (1974). The psychological sense of community: Prospects for a community psychology. San Francisco: Jossey-Bass. (Out of print. See American Psychology and Schools.)
 Sarason, S.B. (1986). Commentary: The emergence of a conceptual center. Journal of Community Psychology, 14, 405-407.
 Wright, S. P. 2004.  Exploring Psychological Sense of Community in Living-Learning Programs. Doctoral Dissertation. University of Maryland.
 Farahani, L. M., & Lozanovska, M. (2014). A framework for exploring the sense of community and social life in residential environments. International Journal of Architectural Research: ArchNet-IJAR, 8(3), 223-237.
 Mahmoudi Farahani, L. (2016). The value of the sense of community and neighbouring. Housing, Theory and Society, 33(3), 357-376.
Chicago

External links 
 http://www.wright-house.com/psychology/sense-of-community.html Psychological Sense of Community]: Theory of McMillan & Chavis.

Applied psychology
Social psychology
Community building
Localism (politics)